"Amigos Para Siempre (Friends for Life)", also called "Amics per sempre" in Catalan, is a official theme song of the 1992 Summer Olympics held in Barcelona, Spain. The music was composed by Andrew Lloyd Webber. The lyrics, written by Don Black, are in English, except for the title phrase which is repeated in English, Spanish and Catalan.

Original version

British soprano Sarah Brightman and Spanish tenor José Carreras performed the song during the closing ceremony of the 1992 Barcelona Olympic Games. The duet was also released worldwide as a single to coincide with the Games, peaking at number 11 on the UK Singles Chart and reaching number one in Australia for six weeks. It was one of two musical themes for the event. The other, simply titled "Barcelona", was sung by Freddie Mercury and Montserrat Caballé, and reached number two in the UK. Both appear on the compilation album Barcelona Gold, released to coincide with the Games.

A remixed version of the original, with less vocal reverb and modified balancing, was included on the compilation album Andrew Lloyd Webber: Now and Forever (2001).

Critical reception
Larry Flick from Billboard described the song as a "Spanish-pop ballad" and noted its "stately performances" by Carreras and Brightman, and the "dramatic orchestral arrangement". He also added that the Spanish-language version has lyrics co-penned by Cuban-American singer and songwriter Gloria Estefan.

Track listing
 "Amigos Para Siempre"
 Live Opening Ceremony Barcelona Olympic 1992 Games
 "Amigos Para Siempre" (Spanish version)
 "Amigos Para Siempre" (Seat Anuncio 60 aniversario) – Marujita

Charts

Weekly charts

Year-end charts

Certifications

Cover versions
In Spain, the most famous rendition of this song was made by Spanish group Los Manolos with rumba arrangements and Spanish lyrics, except for the chorus. It reached number 3 in the Spanish charts. In September 1996, it was later covered by Effie and Norman Gunston and reached the top 30 in Australia at the time.

In one of Andrew Lloyd Webber's Really Useful Group's concerts in Beijing, China, a Chinese version of this song was performed with approximately half of the lyrics in Mandarin and half in English. In this version, Amigos Para Siempre was replaced by "永远的朋友", which is "Friends Forever" in Chinese.  A fully Cantonese version "友愛長存"(literally "eternal friendship") was sung by George Lam.

This song was also used for the Shanghai 2007 Special Olympic Games, performed again by José Carreras and a Chinese soprano.

On Sunday, 17 August 2008 at the Don Black 70th birthday tribute concert Lyrics by Don Black, Amigos Para Siempre was performed by Jonathan Ansell and Hayley Westenra.  The evening took place at the London Palladium featuring performances of Black's songs by a selection of guest artists, hosted by Michael Parkinson and was recorded by BBC Radio 2 Friday Night is Music Night and broadcast on Friday, 22 August 2008.

It was the favourite song of Juan Antonio Samaranch, president of the International Olympic Committee from 1980 to 2001, and was played at his funeral in Barcelona in April 2010. 

In 2014, Katherine Jenkins and the Viennese tenor LASZLO (Also known as Laszlo Maleczky) covered the song on the album "Katherine Jenkins" that was only released in Germany, Austria and Switzerland.

In 2016, Marina Prior and Mark Vincent covered the song on their album Together.

In 2017, G4 covered the song on their latest album "Love Songs".

In 2020, La Poem covered the song on their first mini-album "Scene#1" and performed it at the opening of the 35th Golden Disc Awards.

References

Songs about friendship
1992 songs
1992 Summer Olympics
Polydor Records singles
Olympic theme songs
Summer Olympic official songs and anthems
Male–female vocal duets
Macaronic songs
Songs with music by Andrew Lloyd Webber
Songs with lyrics by Don Black (lyricist)
Sarah Brightman songs
Number-one singles in Australia
Song recordings produced by Nigel Wright (record producer)
1990s ballads
Pop ballads